Olga de Blanck y Martín (11 March 1916 – 28 July 1998) was a Cuban pianist, guitarist and composer. She was born in Havana, the daughter of Hubert de Blanck and Pilar Martín.

Education

In 1924, de Blanck entered the Conservatorio Nacional de Música, which her father founded in 1885, where she studied piano, solfeggio and music theory. After graduating, she continued harmony studies in Havana with noted Cuban composer, violinist and professor of music Amadeo Roldán (1900–1939), and with professor of music and conductor Pedro Sanjuan (1887–1976). She lived in New York City from 1935–1938 and studied fugue and counterpoint there with Brazilian composer Walter Burle Marx (1902–1990). She lived in Mexico from 1943–1944, studying with composer, violinist and music theorist Julián Carrillo (1875–1965) and composer Carlos Jiménez Mabarak (1916–1994).

Career

On her return to Cuba, she joined the staff of the National Conservatory of Music, where she collaborated on its technical direction, and worked with composer and professor of music Gisela Hernández (1912-1971) to develop a pedagogy for teaching elemental music. She also was instrumental in founding Ediciones de Blanck, a publishing house focused on musicology and music pedagogy. She founded the Sala Teatro Hubert de Blanck, and organized an opera department at the Conservatory which allowed both professional and student singers to develop their talents.

In 1956 she created the Conservatory's Departamento de Actividades Culturales, with its three sectors of Music, Theater and Cultural Activities. The latter coordinated education-related meetings and exchanges between the Conservatory's directors and professors, and their counterparts at its affiliated institutions and subsidiaries and at musical institutions in other countries.

In 1945 she was named the Conservatory's deputy director, and in 1955 became its director.

In 1943, de Blanck's musical Vivimos Hoy was first performed. In 1948 she won the Premio Nacional de la Canción Cubana for her song "Mi Guitarra Guajira", dedicated to singer Esther Borja (born 1913). In 1957 she collaborated in the revision of "40 Dances for Piano" by pianist and composer Ignacio Cervantes (1847-1905), published by Ediciones de Blanck in 1959. In 1965 she was designated a member of the committee to review, compile and edit the most relevant recorded and published works of Cuban composers of the 19th and early 20th centuries in order to relaunch them. A year later, she won all ten prizes in a competition for the best children’s songs, held by the Unión de Pioneros de Cuba, the first national effort by the Cuban communist government to promote musical education for children.

In 1961, she prepared for the Escuela de Instructores de Arte a compendium of selected popular Cuban songs from the works of Eliseo Grenet (1893-1950), Ernesto Lecuona (1895-1963), Sindo Garay (1867-1968) and Tania Castellanos (1920-1988), entitled Música Popular Cubana. Beginning in 1966 she launched in conjunction with the Consejo Nacional de Cultura and the Departamento de Música de la Biblioteca Nacional José Martí a research effort to publish a collection of books on the lives and works of Cuban composers. Only a volume on Ignacio Cervantes was actually edited and published.

In 1968 de Blanck was a member of the technical team of the Plan de Educación, and wrote for the magazine Simientes, for teachers and parents of kindergarteners. In 1971 she co-founded the Museo de la Música in Havana. 

As a music educator, de Blanck was greatly influential in the introduction of new methods and programs in Cuban schools. She was the founder of the Cuban musical kindergarten, and with Gisela Hernández, wrote and composed children's songs (approximately 110), musical games and story books, short pieces for piano, and books on promoting music appreciation in young children.

Many of her compositions are inspired by the music, rhythms, and traditional instruments of Cuban folk music, especially the guitar.

Death
De Blanck died in Havana on 28 July 1998, at the age of 82.

Works
Canciones: setenta y tres canciones; Songs; 1935-1954
Vivimos hoy; Musical in 3 Acts, text by María Julia Casanova; 1943
Hotel Tropical; Musical in 3 Acts, text by María Julia Casanova; 1944
Así te quise; Text by María Collazo; 1954
Guíame a Belén; Song; 1957
Muy felices pascuas; Song; 1957
Canto porque te quiero; Song; 1957
Mi guitarra guajira; Song; 1957
Recuerdas aquel diciembre; Song; 1957
Se que volverás; Song; 1957
La vida es el amor; Song; 1957
Brujos; Song; 1957
¿Qué estaba pensando?; Song; 1957
Hasta mañana mi amor; Song; 1957
Por lejos que estés; Song; 1957
Hasta luego mi amor; Song; 1957
Embrujo de amor; Song; 1957
Un cuento de Navidad; Musical in 3 Acts, text by María Julia Casanova; 1958
17 canciones cubanas; Songs; 1960-1970
6 traditional Cuban and Latin American Carols; Choral music; 1961-1962
24 traditional Cuban and Latin American Songs; Songs; 1961-1962
El encuentro; Ballet; 1962
Bohio; Ballet; 1964
109 canciones; Songs; 1966-1973
El mago de Oz; Theater music in 1 Act (incidental music); 1967
El caballito enano; Musical fairy-tale in 1 Act, text by Dora Alonso; 1967
Saltarín; Musical fairy-tale, text by Dora Alonso; 1967
Cantata guajira; Cantata for solo voice, mixed chorus, and orchestra; text by Emilio Ballagas; 1967
Trío de Cecilia Arizti; Trio for violin, cello and piano; 1968-1969
Trío de Hubert de Blanck; Trio for violin, cello and piano; 1968-1969
Mi patria cubana; Children's Songs; 1969
26 sobre mi tierra; Lyrics by Mirta Aguirre; 1969
Canciones infantiles: La guira; Children's Songs; 1970
La tojosa; Lyrics by Dora Alonso; 1970
Pentasílabo; Instrumental - for piano, güiro, quijada, and tumbadora; 1972
Décima es; Lyrics by Mirta Aguirre; 1972
Yo sé los nombres extraños; Lyrics by José Martí; 1972
Aprende que hoy no es ayer; Lyrics by Mirta Aguirre; 1972
Yo no me quejo no; Song; 1972
Canciones de Misifú; Children's Songs; 1972
Paso una paloma; Lyrics byNicolás Guillén; 1973
Camino mujer sin sombra; Lyrics by Mirta Aguirre; 1973
El agua lenta del río; Lyrics by Mirta Aguirre; 1973
No quiero aprender tus bailes; Lyrics by Mirta Aguirre; 1973
5 canciones; Lyrics by Pepita Veritsky; 1973
Decimas guerreras; Choral music after the opera Patria by Hubert de Blanck; 1979
Portocromía; Piano; 1981
Misa cubana; Mass for mixed voices and organ; 1987
Mayombe-Bombe-mayombe; Instrumental; 1987
Son; Lyrics by Rosario Antuña; 1988
Plegaria Así dijo Santa Rosa Filipa; For solo voice and organ; 1989
Caña dulce (Sugar Cane); Piano
El guajirito (The Country Farm Worker); Piano
Homenaje a la danza cubana (Homage to the Cuban Dance); Piano: I - Manuel Saumell; II - Ignacio Cervantes ; III - Ernesto Lecuona
La jaquita criolla (The Native Jaquita); Piano
Further educational work, often with Gisela Hernández and transcriptions and arrangements of compositions by other composers.

References

Frank Rijckaert, Biography of Hubert de Blanck, Calbona Uitgeverij Rotterdam, 2013, 
Armando Linares, producer and director. Así te quise.(documentary 1997, La Habana Cuba)

1916 births
1998 deaths
20th-century classical composers
Cuban music educators
Women classical composers
Cuban composers
Women music educators
20th-century women composers